The Baloncesto Superior Nacional Femenino (BSNF) is the top professional women's basketball league in Puerto Rico.

Current teams
The current league organization features 8 teams and is in the process of expansion.

See also
 Puerto Rico women's national basketball team
 Baloncesto Superior Nacional

References

External links
 Official site 

National Superior Basketball
Women's basketball in Puerto Rico
1974 establishments in Puerto Rico
Sports leagues established in 1974
Baloncesto
Professional sports leagues in Puerto Rico